Weekley is a surname. Notable people with the surname include:

 Boo Weekley (born 1973), American professional golfer
 Ernest Weekley (1865–1954), British philologist
 Frieda Weekley (1879–1956), German translator
 Jim Weekley (born 1947), American politician